Marzrud (also Romanized as Marzrūd, Marz Rood, and Marz Rūd; also known as Marzru) is a village in Misheh Pareh Rural District, in the Central District of Kaleybar County, East Azerbaijan Province, Iran. At the 2006 census, its population was 184, in 50 families.  In past the pastures of Marzrud were the summer quarter of Mohammad Khanlu tribe.

References 

Populated places in Kaleybar County